Rather You Than Me is the ninth studio album by American rapper Rick Ross. It was released on March 17, 2017, through Maybach Music Group and Epic Records. The album features guest appearances from Raphael Saadiq, Chris Rock, Young Thug, Wale, Future, Jeezy, Yo Gotti, Gucci Mane, Ty Dolla Sign, Nas, Meek Mill, Anthony Hamilton, Scrilla, and Dej Loaf. It was supported by two singles: "I Think She Like Me", and "Trap Trap Trap".

Rather You Than Me charted at number three on the US Billboard 200, and received positive critical reviews from critics.

Promotion
The album's lead single, "I Think She Like Me", was released on January 26, 2017. The song features a guest appearance from American recording artist Ty Dolla Sign. The music video for the song was released on January 27, 2017.

"Trap Trap Trap" was first released as the album's promotional single on March 10, 2017. The song features guest appearances from American rappers Young Thug and Wale. It was later released as the album's second official single on May 16, 2017.

Promotional singles
The album's first promotional single, "She on My Dick", was released on March 13, 2017. The song features a guest appearance from American rapper Gucci Mane.

The album's second promotional single, "Dead Presidents", was released on March 15, 2017. The song features guest appearances from American rappers Future, Jeezy and Yo Gotti.

Critical reception

Rather You Than Me was met with generally positive reviews. At Metacritic, which assigns a normalized rating out of 100 to reviews from professional publications, the album received an average score of 71, based on nine reviews.

Damiem Morris of The Observer said, "The more modish tracks are somehow less inventive than their titles, but there's much southern-stewed, offbeat beauty elsewhere to compensate." Preezy of XXL said, "Nine albums removed from anonymity, Rather You Than Me secures Rick Ross' slot within the list Top 5 of rap soloists to emerge from the South over the last 20 years, and is among his more cohesive bodies of work to date." Jesse Fairfax of HipHopDX said, "Neither timeless nor immediately disposable, Rather You Than Me is an above average outing that displays why he's steadily remained within the public eye without having a long line of record-breaking hits." Steve "Flash" Juon of RapReviews said, "Rick Ross' Rather You Than Me is fun to listen to." Paul A. Thompson of Pitchfork said, "Rather You Than Me is a smooth, enjoyable attempt to wrestle the spotlight back onto his solo work." Kellan Miller of Drowned in Sound said, "Overall, Rather You Than Me is another example of Ross' gift at making albums, even though he litters the radio with corny one liners."

Andy Kellman of AllMusic said, "Ross' mixtures of outrageous fantasy and sobering reality, side-splitting humor, and piercing vengeance, are intermittently as potent as ever." Calum Slingerland of Exclaim! said, "It isn't without its flaws, but Rather You Than Me positions Rick Ross as the boss he's always claimed to be, his raps reinforced by lofty, gold-plated production and added lyrical depth that's as refreshing as a glass of Belaire Rosé." Mosi Reeves of Rolling Stone said, "Musically, he's drifting through a mid-career malaise. The beats he uses are the same worn poles of yacht-rap luxury and trap bangers that he's relied on since his 2010 watermark Teflon Don. Lyrically, he's still capable of speaking truth to power with remarkable clarity."

Commercial performance
Rather You Than Me debuted at number three on the US Billboard 200 with 106,000 album-equivalent units, of which 70,000 were pure album sales.

Track listing

Notes
  signifies a co-producer
 "Powers That Be" features additional vocals by Ink
 "Lamborghini Doors" features additional vocals by Dria and Teedra Moses
 "Maybach Music V" features additional vocals by Katt Rockell

Sample credits
 "Santorini Greece" contains elements from "Colours of My Dreams", written by Judy Bailey and John Parker, performed by Judy Bailey Quartet.
 "Idols Become Rivals" contains elements from "Agua de Dos Rios", written by Rafael Perez-Botiha, performed by Camilo Sesto.
 "I Think She Like Me" contains a sample from "People Make the World Go Round", written by Thomas Randolph Bell and Linda Epstein, as performed by The Stylistics.
 "Triple Platinum" contains an excerpt from the film Adjust Your Color.

Charts

Weekly charts

Year-end charts

References

2017 albums
Rick Ross albums
Epic Records albums
Maybach Music Group albums
Albums produced by Lil' C (record producer)
Albums produced by Beat Butcha
Albums produced by Bink (record producer)